Patrice Servelle (born 20 July 1974, in Monaco) is a Monégasque Olympic bobsledder who has competed in the 2002, 2006, and the 2010 Winter Olympics. Servelle's placed 12th overall at the 2006 Winter Olympics, and was Monaco's flag bearer during the Opening Ceremony. He also finished the two-man Bobsleigh World Cup in second place, which was Monaco's first, and only World Cup medal.

Servelle's best finish at the FIBT World Championships was tenth in the four-man event at St. Moritz, Switzerland in 2007.

References

External links

Patrice Servelle bio

1974 births
Bobsledders at the 2002 Winter Olympics
Bobsledders at the 2006 Winter Olympics
Bobsledders at the 2010 Winter Olympics
Bobsledders at the 2014 Winter Olympics
Living people
Monegasque male bobsledders
Olympic bobsledders of Monaco